Heavy Load Blues the twelfth studio album is by American band Gov't Mule. It was released on November 12, 2021 by Fantasy Records.

Heavy Load Blues was nominated for a Grammy award for Best Traditional Blues Album.

Critical reception
Heavy Load Blues was received with very positive reviews by critics. This release has an score of 84 out of 100 at Metacritic, based on the weighted average of 4 reviews - ranging from 60 to 90 out of 100 - from mainstream publications.

In a review for PopMatters, writer Michael Elliot wrote: "Gov't Mule's first strictly "all-blues" album, "Heavy Load Blues", is not-so-strictly that at all, but a soul-baring journey of the blues, mainly through the lens of soul and hard rock, in all its complexity, beauty, darkness, and glory."

In the album's review at AllMusic, Thom Jurek said: "Heavy Load Blues is raw, heavy, and immediate, the sound of a band unfettered while pursuing a deep blue groove that never quits."

Track listing

Personnel

Band 

 Warren Haynes – vocals, guitar, producer
 Matt Abts – drums
 Jorgen Carlsson – bass
 Danny Louis – keyboards, guitar, backing vocals

Additional musicians 

 Hook Herrera – harmonica (tracks: 1.1, 2.5, 2.8)
 Jenny Hill – saxophone (tracks: 1.2, 2.2)
 Buford O'Sullivan – trombone (tracks: 1.2, 2.2)
 Pam Fleming – trumpet (tracks: 1.2, 2.2)

Technical personnel 

 John Paterno – producer, engineer, mixing 
 Stef Scamardo – executive producer
 Evan Bakke – assistant engineer
 Greg Calbi, Steve Fallone – mastering
 Jorgen Carlsson – remix (tracks: 2.7-8)
 Jay Sansone, Human Being Media – photography 
 Jeff Anders – painting

Charts

References

External links
 
 

2021 albums
Gov't Mule albums